Inula royleana is a species of plant in the daisy family Asteraceae. It is native to Pakistan and the western Himalayas.

References

External links
Plants for a Future Inula royleana

royleana
Flora of Asia